The 1906–07 Illinois Fighting Illini men's basketball team represented the University of Illinois.

Regular season
Frank Loyer Pinckney took over the coaching reins from Elwood Brown for the 1906–1907 season. After a very promising start to the season, where more than 100 student athletes tried out for the team, Pinckney had three freshman declared ineligible by the Western Conference.   Due to this unfortunate circumstance, the Fighting Illini played the season with a depleted lineup and finished the season with the worst record in the history of the school.  The decision to make freshmen ineligible gave Pinckney the same problem Brown had faced one season earlier.

Roster

Source

Schedule
												
Source																

|-	
!colspan=12 style="background:#DF4E38; color:white;"| Non-Conference regular season
|- align="center" bgcolor=""

	
|-
!colspan=9 style="background:#DF4E38; color:#FFFFFF;"|Big Ten regular season				

|-

Awards and honors

References

Illinois Fighting Illini
Illinois Fighting Illini men's basketball seasons
1906 in sports in Illinois
1907 in sports in Illinois